Croft Hill is a  biological Site of Special Scientific Interest north of Croft in Leicestershire. 

This site has short, tussocky grass in an open habitat, a nationally rare vegetation type. The granitic soil is thin and short of nutrients. The nationally scarce upright chickweed is abundant in some areas.

There is access to the site from Croft Hill Road, between the villages of Huncote and Croft.

The area consists of a small hill connected to a larger hill, both of which can be reached by foot. Adjacent to these hills is a nature reserve with enclosed lake, where visitors can stand on a wooden deck over the water. The lake is populated with a collection of reeds and other natural flora.

References

Sites of Special Scientific Interest in Leicestershire